Neocrepidodera albanica is a species of flea beetle in the leaf beetle family that can be found only in Albania and North Macedonia.

References

Beetles described in 1965
Beetles of Europe
albanica